Malevizi is a municipality in Heraklion regional unit, Crete, Greece. The seat of the municipality is the town of Gazi.

Municipality
The municipality Malevizi was formed at the 2011 local government reform by the merger of the following 3 former municipalities, that became municipal units:
Gazi
Krousonas
Tylisos

Province
The province of Malevizi was one of the provinces of the Heraklion Prefecture. Its territory corresponded with that of the current municipality Malevizi, the municipal unit Gorgolainis and parts of Paliani and Heraklion. It was abolished in 2006.

References

Municipalities of Crete
Provinces of Greece
Populated places in Heraklion (regional unit)